This is a bibliography of the works of Elie Wiesel.

Non-fiction

Portraits and Legends theological biography series

Novels

Collection of works
 Legends of our Time (Holt, Rinehart and Winston 1968)(Artistically depicted memories)
 Night/Dawn/Day (1985) (First memoir & first two novels)

Cantatas
 Ani Maamin (Random House 1973; subtitled "un chant perdu et retrouvé", music by Darius Milhaud, Op. 441, soprano, 4 reciters. chorus and orchestra)
 A Song for Hope (1987; music by David Diamond, premiered New York June 10, 1987)

Plays
 Zalmen, or the Madness of God (Random House 1974)
 The Trial of God (Random House 1979) (Play)

Children's literature
 The Golem (illustrated by Mark Podwal) (Summit 1983) 
 King Solomon and his Magic Ring (illustrated by Mark Podwal) (Greenwillow 1999)

Film adaptations
Elie Wiesel's novel L'Aube (Dawn) was adapted twice to the screen:
 1985 by Miklós Jancsó. The French-Hungarian coproduction Dawn is starring Michael York, Philippe Léotard and Christine Boisson.
 2014 by Romed Wyder. The Swiss-UK-German-Israeli coproduction Dawn is starring Jason Isaacs, Joel Basman and Sarah Adler.

Additional contributions
 "Foreword." In: Vishniac, Roman. A Vanished World. New York: Farrar, Straus and Giroux, 1983. . .
A documentary record of the lives of the Jews of Eastern Europe 1934-1939, with commentary by the photographer.
 "Foreword." (pp. XXVII-XXVIII) In: Megargee, Geoffrey P. (ed). The United States Holocaust Memorial Museum Encyclopedia of Camps and Ghettos, 1933-1945, Volume I: Early Camps, Youth Camps, and Concentration Camps and Subcamps under the SS-Business Administration Main Office (WVHA). Bloomington and Indianapolis: Indiana University Press in association with the United States Holocaust Memorial Museum, 2009. .

References

External links
 "Elie Wiesel on Rashi," Amazon.com video interview

Wiesel, Elie